William Holden (born William Franklin Beedle Jr.; April 17, 1918 – November 12, 1981) was an American actor and one of the biggest box-office draws of the 1950s. Holden won the Academy Award for Best Actor for the film Stalag 17 (1953) and the Primetime Emmy Award for Outstanding Lead Actor in a Limited Series or Movie for the television miniseries The Blue Knight (1973). Holden starred in some of Hollywood's most popular and critically acclaimed films, including Sunset Boulevard (1950), Sabrina (1954), Picnic (1955), The Bridge on the River Kwai (1957), The Wild Bunch (1969) and Network (1976). He was named one of the "Top 10 Stars of the Year" six times (1954–1958, 1961), and appeared as 25th on the American Film Institute's list of 25 greatest male stars of Classical Hollywood cinema.

While in Italy in 1966, Holden was responsible for the death of another driver in a drunk-driving incident near Pisa. He received an eight-month suspended sentence for vehicular manslaughter.

Early life and education

Holden was born William Franklin Beedle, Jr., on April 17, 1918, in O'Fallon, Illinois, son of Mary Blanche Beedle (née Ball), a schoolteacher, and her husband William Franklin Beedle, an industrial chemist. He had two younger brothers, Robert Westfield Beedle and Richard Porter Beedle. One of his father's grandmothers, Rebecca Westfield, was born in England, while some of his mother's ancestors settled in Virginia's Lancaster County after emigrating from England in the 17th century. His brother Robert ("Bobbie") became a U.S. Navy fighter pilot and was killed in action in World War II, over New Ireland, a Japanese-occupied island in the South Pacific.

His family moved to South Pasadena when he was three. After graduating from South Pasadena High School, Holden attended Pasadena Junior College, where he became involved in local radio plays.

Career

Paramount
Holden appeared uncredited in Prison Farm (1939) and Million Dollar Legs (1939) at Paramount.

A version of how he obtained his stage name "Holden" is based on a statement by George Ross of Billboard: "William Holden, the lad just signed for the coveted lead in Golden Boy, used to be Bill Beadle. And here is how he obtained his new movie tag. On the Columbia lot is an assistant director and scout named Harold Winston. Not long ago, he was divorced from the actress, Gloria Holden, but carried the torch after the marital rift. Winston was one of those who discovered the Golden Boy newcomer and who renamed him—in honor of his former spouse!"

Golden Boy

Holden's first starring role was in Golden Boy (1939), costarring Barbara Stanwyck, in which he played a violinist-turned-boxer. The film was made for Columbia, which negotiated a sharing agreement with Paramount for Holden's services.

Holden was still an unknown actor when he made Golden Boy, while Stanwyck was already a film star. She liked Holden and went out of her way to help him succeed, devoting her personal time to coaching and encouraging him, which made them into lifelong friends. When she received her Honorary Oscar at the 1982 Academy Award ceremony, Holden had died in an accident just a few months prior. At the end of her acceptance speech, she paid him a personal tribute: "I loved him very much, and I miss him. He always wished that I would get an Oscar. And so tonight, my golden boy, you got your wish".

Next he starred with George Raft and Humphrey Bogart in the Warner Bros. gangster epic Invisible Stripes (1939), billed below Raft and above Bogart.

Back at Paramount, he starred with Bonita Granville in Those Were the Days! (1940) followed by the role of George Gibbs in the film adaptation of Our Town (1940), done for Sol Lesser at United Artists.

Columbia put Holden in a Western with Jean Arthur, Arizona (1940), then at Paramount he was in a hugely popular war film, I Wanted Wings (1941) with Ray Milland and Veronica Lake.

He did another Western at Columbia, Texas (1941) with Glenn Ford, and a musical comedy at Paramount, The Fleet's In (1942) with Eddie Bracken, Dorothy Lamour, and Betty Hutton.

He stayed at Paramount for The Remarkable Andrew (1942) with Brian Donlevy, then made Meet the Stewarts (1943) at Columbia. Paramount reunited Bracken and him in Young and Willing (1943).

World War II
Holden served as a second and then a first lieutenant in the United States Army Air Force during World War II, where he acted in training films for the First Motion Picture Unit, including Reconnaissance Pilot (1943).

Post war
Holden's first film back from the services was Blaze of Noon (1947), an aviator picture at Paramount directed by John Farrow. He followed it with a romantic comedy, Dear Ruth (1947) and he was one of many cameos in Variety Girl (1947).  RKO borrowed him for Rachel and the Stranger (1948) with Robert Mitchum and Loretta Young. Holden starred in the 20th Century Fox film Apartment for Peggy (1948). At Columbia, he starred in film noirs, The Dark Past (1948), The Man from Colorado (1949) and Father Is a Bachelor (1950). At Paramount, he did another Western, Streets of Laredo (1949). Columbia teamed him with Lucille Ball for Miss Grant Takes Richmond (1949), and the sequel to Dear Ruth, Dear Wife (1949).

Sunset Boulevard

Holden's career took off again in 1950 when Billy Wilder tapped him to play a down-at-heel screenwriter taken in by a faded silent film actress (Gloria Swanson) in Sunset Boulevard. Holden earned his first Best Actor Oscar nomination for the role.

Getting the role was a lucky break for Holden, as Montgomery Clift was initially cast but backed out of his contract. Swanson later said, "Bill Holden was a man I could have fallen in love with. He was perfection on- and off-screen." And Wilder commented "Bill was a complex guy, a totally honorable friend. He was a genuine star. Every woman was in love with him." Paramount reunited him with Nancy Olson, one of his Sunset Boulevard costars, in Union Station (1950).

Holden had another good break when he was cast as Judy Holliday's love interest in the big-screen adaptation of the Broadway hit  Born Yesterday (1950). He made two more films with Olson: Force of Arms (1951) at Warner Bros. and Submarine Command (1951) at Paramount. Holden did a sports film at Columbia, Boots Malone (1952), then returned to Paramount for The Turning Point (1952).

Stalag 17 and peak of stardom
Holden was reunited with Wilder in Stalag 17 (1953), for which Holden won the Academy Award for Best Actor. This ushered in the peak years of Holden's stardom. He made a sex comedy with David Niven for Otto Preminger, The Moon Is Blue (1953), which was a huge hit, in part due to controversy over its content. At Paramount, he was in a comedy with Ginger Rogers that was not particularly popular, Forever Female (1953). A Western at MGM, Escape from Fort Bravo (1953) did much better, and the all-star Executive Suite (1954) was a notable success.

Sabrina

Holden made a third film with Wilder, Sabrina (1954), billed beneath Audrey Hepburn and Humphrey Bogart. Holden and Hepburn became romantically involved during the filming, unbeknownst to Wilder: "People on the set told me later that Bill and Audrey were having an affair, and everybody knew. Well, not everybody! I didn't know." The interactions between Bogart, Hepburn and Holden made shooting less than pleasant, as Bogart had wanted his wife, Lauren Bacall, to play Sabrina. Bogart was not especially friendly toward Hepburn, who had little Hollywood experience, while Holden's reaction was the opposite, wrote biographer Michelangelo Capua. Holden recalls their romance: Their relationship did not last much beyond the completion of the film. Holden, who was at this point dependent on alcohol, said, "I really was in love with Audrey, but she wouldn't marry me." Rumors at the time had it that Hepburn wanted a family, but when Holden told her that he had had a vasectomy and having children was impossible, she moved on. (A few months later, Hepburn met Mel Ferrer, whom she later married and with whom she had a son Sean Hepburn Ferrer.)

He took third billing for The Country Girl (1954) with Bing Crosby and Grace Kelly, directed by George Seaton from a play by Clifford Odets. It was a big hit, as was The Bridges at Toko-Ri (1954), a Korean War drama with Kelly.

In 1954, Holden was featured on the cover of Life. On February 7, 1955, Holden appeared as a guest star on I Love Lucy as himself. The golden run at the box office continued with Love Is a Many-Splendored Thing (1955), from a best-selling novel, with Jennifer Jones, and Picnic (1955), as a drifter, in an adaptation of the William Inge play with Kim Novak. Picnic was his last film under the contract with Columbia.

A second film with Seaton did not do as well, The Proud and Profane (1956), where Holden played the role with a moustache. Neither did Toward the Unknown (1957), the one film Holden produced himself.

The Bridge on the River Kwai

Holden had his most widely recognized role as "Commander" Shears in David Lean's The Bridge on the River Kwai (1957) with Alec Guinness, a huge commercial success. His deal was considered one of the best ever for an actor at the time, with him receiving 10% of the gross, which earned him over $2.5 million, however, Holden stipulated that he should only receive a maximum of $50,000 per year from the film.

He made another war film for a British director, The Key (1958) with Trevor Howard and Sophia Loren for director Carol Reed. He played an American Civil War military surgeon in John Ford's The Horse Soldiers (1959) opposite John Wayne, which was a box-office disappointment. Columbia would not meet Holden's asking price of $750,000 and 10% of the gross for The Guns of Navarone (1961); the amount of money Holden asked exceeded the combined salaries of stars Gregory Peck, David Niven, and Anthony Quinn.

Holden had another hit with The World of Suzie Wong  (1960) with Nancy Kwan, which was shot in Hong Kong. Less popular was Satan Never Sleeps (1961), the last film of Clifton Webb and Leo McCarey; The Counterfeit Traitor (1962), his third film with Seaton; or The Lion (1962), with Trevor Howard and Capucine. The latter was shot in Africa and sparked Holden's fascination with the continent that was to last for the rest of his life.

Holden's films continued to struggle at the box office, however: Paris When It Sizzles (1964) with Hepburn was shot in 1962 but given a much delayed release, The 7th Dawn (1964) with Capucine and Susannah York, a romantic adventure set during the Malayan Emergency produced by Charles K. Feldman, Alvarez Kelly (1966), a Western, and The Devil's Brigade (1968). He was also one of many stars in Feldman's Casino Royale (1967).

The Wild Bunch

In 1969, Holden made a comeback when he starred in director Sam Peckinpah's graphically violent Western The Wild Bunch, winning much acclaim. Also in 1969, Holden starred in director Terence Young's family film L'Arbre de Noël, co-starring Italian actress Virna Lisi and French actor Bourvil, based on the novel of the same name by Michel Bataille. This film was originally released in the United States as The Christmas Tree and on home video as When Wolves Cry. Holden made a Western with Ryan O'Neal and Blake Edwards, Wild Rovers (1971). It was not particularly successful. Neither was The Revengers (1972), another Western.

For television roles in 1974, Holden won a Primetime Emmy Award for Outstanding Lead Actor in a Miniseries or a Movie for his portrayal of a cynical, tough veteran LAPD street cop in the television film The Blue Knight, based upon the best-selling Joseph Wambaugh novel of the same name.

In 1973, Holden starred with Kay Lenz in a movie directed by Clint Eastwood called Breezy, which was considered a box-office flop. Also in 1974, Holden starred with Paul Newman and Steve McQueen in the critically acclaimed disaster film The Towering Inferno, which became a box-office smash and one of the highest-grossing films of Holden's career.

Two years later, he was praised for his Oscar-nominated leading performance in Sidney Lumet's classic Network (1976), an examination of the media written by Paddy Chayefsky, playing an older version of the character type for which he had become iconic in the 1950s, only now more jaded and aware of his own mortality. Around this time he also appeared in 21 Hours at Munich (1976).

Final roles
Holden made a fourth and final film for Wilder with Fedora (1978). He followed it with Damien: Omen II (1978) and had a cameo in Escape to Athena (1978), which co-starred his real-life love interest Stefanie Powers. Holden had a supporting role in Ashanti (1979) and was third-billed in another disaster film, When Time Ran Out... (1980), which was a flop. Holden starred in The Earthling, as a loner dying of cancer at the Australian outback and accompanying an orphan boy (Ricky Schroder). After his final film S.O.B., Holden declined to star in Jason Miller's film That Championship Season.

Personal life

Holden was best man at the wedding of his friend Ronald Reagan to actress Nancy Davis in 1952. Although a registered Republican, he never involved himself in politics.

While in Italy in 1966, Holden was responsible for the death of another driver in a drunk-driving incident near Pisa. He received an eight-month suspended sentence for vehicular manslaughter.

Holden maintained a home in Switzerland and also spent much of his time working for wildlife conservation as a managing partner in an animal preserve in Africa. His Mount Kenya Safari Club in Nanyuki (founded 1959) was popular with the international jet set. On a trip to Africa, he fell in love with the wildlife and became increasingly concerned with the animal species that were beginning to decrease in population. With the help of his partners, he created the Mount Kenya Game Ranch and inspired the creation of the William Holden Wildlife Foundation.

Marriage and relationships
Holden had a daughter born in 1937 from his relationship with actress Eva May Hoffman.

Holden was married to actress Brenda Marshall from 1941 until their divorce in 1971. They had two sons, Peter and Scott.  

Holden met French actress Capucine in the early 1960s. The two starred in the films The Lion (1962) and The 7th Dawn (1964). They reportedly began a two-year affair, which is alleged to have ended due to Holden's alcoholism. Capucine and Holden remained friends until his death in 1981.

In 1972, Holden began a nine-year relationship with actress Stefanie Powers and sparked her interest in animal welfare. After his death, Powers set up the William Holden Wildlife Foundation at Holden's Mount Kenya Game Ranch.

Death
According to the Los Angeles County Coroner's autopsy report, Holden bled to death in his apartment in Santa Monica, California, on November 12, 1981, after lacerating his forehead from slipping on a rug while intoxicated and hitting a bedside table. Forensic evidence recovered at the scene suggested that he was conscious for at least half an hour after the fall. His body was found four days later. Rumors existed that he was suffering from lung cancer, which Holden had denied at a 1980 press conference. His death certificate makes no mention of cancer. He dictated in his will that the Neptune Society cremate him and scatter his ashes in the Pacific Ocean. In accordance with his wishes, no funeral or memorial services were conducted.

President Ronald Reagan released a statement: "I have a great feeling of grief. We were close friends for many years. What do you say about a longtime friend – a sense of personal loss, a fine man. Our friendship never waned." 

For his contribution to the film industry, Holden has a star on the Hollywood Walk of Fame located at 1651 Vine Street. He also has a star on the St. Louis Walk of Fame. 

His death was noted by singer-songwriter Suzanne Vega, whose 1987 song "Tom's Diner", about a sequence of events one morning in 1981, included a mention of reading a newspaper article about "an actor who had died while he was drinking". Vega subsequently confirmed that this was a reference to Holden.

Filmography

Film

Television

Radio

Box-office ranking
For a number of years, exhibitors voted Holden among the most popular stars in the country:
 1954 – 7th (US)
 1955 – 4th (US)
 1956 – 1st (US)
 1957 – 7th (US)
 1958 – 6th (US), 6th (UK)
 1959 – 12th (US)
 1960 – 14th (US)
 1961 – 8th (US)
 1962 – 15th (US)

References

Bibliography
 Capua, Michelangelo (2010). William Holden: A Biography. Jefferson, North Carolina: McFarland & Company. .
 .
 .
 .
 .
 .
 .
 .

External links

 
 
 In Loving Memory Of William Holden
 Profile @ Turner Classic Movies
 William Holden Wildlife Foundation
 Image of William Holden and Brenda Marshall, Academy Awards, Los Angeles, 1951. Los Angeles Times Photographic Archive (Collection 1429). UCLA Library Special Collections, Charles E. Young Research Library, University of California, Los Angeles.

1918 births
1981 deaths
American male film actors
American male television actors
20th-century American male actors
Best Actor Academy Award winners
Outstanding Performance by a Lead Actor in a Miniseries or Movie Primetime Emmy Award winners
Male Western (genre) film actors
Columbia Pictures contract players
Paramount Pictures contract players
Male actors from Illinois
Male actors from Pasadena, California
California Republicans
United States Army Air Forces officers
First Motion Picture Unit personnel
Keepers of animal sanctuaries
Pasadena City College alumni
People from St. Clair County, Illinois
Military personnel from Illinois
American people of English descent
Accidental deaths from falls
Accidental deaths in California
Deaths from bleeding
Alcohol-related deaths in California
Burials at sea
United Service Organizations entertainers